Paschal Sheehy is an Irish journalist. He has served as Southern Editor for RTÉ News since August 1997. He also worked in the print media as a journalist with The Kerryman and as news editor with The Examiner.

References

Living people
RTÉ newsreaders and journalists
Year of birth missing (living people)